The Valea Albă is a left tributary of the river Barcău in Romania. It discharges into the Barcău near Chiraleu.

References

Rivers of Romania
Rivers of Bihor County